Japanese civil war may refer to:

 Civil War of Wa
 Sengoku period
 Boshin War